This is a list of works by Gary Paulsen (May 17, 1939 – October 13, 2021), an American writer of children's and young adult fiction.

Fiction

Brian's Saga
Hatchet (1987)
The River (Hatchet: The Return) (1991)
Brian's Winter (Hatchet: Winter) (1996)
Brian's Return (Hatchet: The Call) (1999)
Brian's Hunt (2003)

Mr. Tucket Saga
Mr. Tucket (1969)
Call Me Francis Tucket (1995)
Tucket's Ride (1997)
Tucket's Gold (1999)
Tucket's Home (2000)

Murphy series
Murphy (1987)
Murphy's Gold (1988)
Murphy's Herd (1989)
Murphy's War (1990)
Co-authored by Brian Burks
Murphy's Stand (1993)
Murphy's Ambush (1995)
Murphy's Trail (1996)

Alida's series
The Cookcamp (1991)
Alida's Song (1999)
The Quilt (2004)

World of Adventure
The Legend of Red Horse Cavern (1994)
Rodomonte's Revenge (Video Trap) (1994)
Escape from Fire Mountain (1995)
The Rock Jockeys (Devil's Wall) (1995)
Hook 'Em Snotty! (1995)
Danger on Midnight River (1995)
The Gorgon Slayer (1995)
Captive! (1995)
Project - A Perfect World (Perfect Danger) (1996)
The Treasure of El Patron (Treasure Ship) (1996)
Skydive! (1996)
The Seventh Crystal (1996)
The Creature of Black Water Lake (1997)
Time Benders (1997)
Grizzly (1997)
Thunder Valley (1998)
Curse of the Ruins (1998)
Flight of the Hawk (1998)

Tales to Tickle the Funnybone
The Boy Who Owned the School (1990)
Harris and Me (1993)
The Schernoff Discoveries (1997)
The Glass Cafe (2003)
Molly McGinty Has a Really Good Day (2004)
The Amazing Life of Birds: The Twenty-Day Puberty Journal of Duane Homer Leech (2006)

Culpepper Adventures
The Case of the Dirty Bird (1992)
Dunc's Doll (1992)
Culpepper's Cannon (1992)
Dunc Gets Tweaked (1992)
Dunc's Halloween (1992)
Dunc Breaks the Record (1992)
Dunc and the Flaming Ghost (1992)
Amos Gets Famous (1993)
Dunc and Amos Hit the Big Top (1993)
Dunc's Dump (1993)
Dunc and the Scam Artists (1993)
Dunc and Amos and the Red Tattoos (1993)
Dunc's Undercover Christmas (1993)
Wild Culpepper Cruise (1993)
Dunc and the Haunted Castle (1993)
Cowpokes and Desperadoes (1994)
Prince Amos (1994)
Coach Amos (1994)
Amos and the Alien (1994)
Dunc and Amos Meet the Slasher (1994)
Dunc and the Greased Sticks of Doom (1994)
Amos's Killer Concert Caper (1994)
Amos Gets Married (1995)
Amos Goes Bananas (1995)
Dunc and Amos Go to the Dogs (1996)
Amos and the Vampire (1996)
Amos and the Chameleon Caper (1996)
Amos Binder, Secret Agent (1997)
Dunc and Amos on Thin Ice (1997)
Super Amos (1997)

Liar, Liar series
Liar, Liar: The Theory, Practice and Destructive Properties of Deception (2011)
Flat Broke: The Theory, Practice and Destructive Properties of Greed (2011)
Crush: The Theory, Practice and Destructive Properties of Love (2012)
Vote: The Theory, Practice, and Destructive Properties of Politics (2013)
Family Ties: The Theory, Practice, and Destructive Properties of Relatives (2014)

Other novels
The Special War (1966)
Some Birds Don't Fly (1968)
The Death Specialists (1976)
The Implosion Effect (1976)
C. B. Jockey (1977) (alternate title of The C.B. Radio Caper?)
The Golden Stick (1977)
Tiltawhirl John (1977) (also known as Tasting the Thunder in the UK)
The C. B. Radio Caper (1977)
Foxman (1977)
Winterkill (1977)
The Curse of the Cobra (1977)
The Green Recruit (1978)
The Spitball Gang (1980)
Compkill (1981)
The Sweeper (1981)
Clutterkill (1982)
Dancing Carl (1983)
Popcorn Days and Buttermilk Nights (1983)
Tracker (1984)
Dogsong (1985)
Sentries (1986)
The Crossing (1987)
The Island (1988)
Night Rituals (1989)
The Voyage of the Frog (1989)
The Winter Room (1989)
Canyons (1990)
Kill Fee (1990)
The Foxman (1990)
The Night the White Deer Died (1990)
The Monument (1991)
Clabbered Dirt, Sweet Grass (1992)
The Haymeadow (1992) (known as The Fourteenth Summer in the UK)
A Christmas Sonata (1992)
Dogteam (1993)
Nightjohn (1993)
Sisters / Hermanas (1993) 
The Car (1994)
The Tent  (1995)
The Tortilla Factory (1995)
The Rifle (1995)
Sarny (1997)
Worksong (1997)
Ice Race (1997)
The Transall Saga (1998) (known as Blue Light in the UK)
Soldier's Heart (1998)
Canoe Days (1999)
The Beet Fields (2000)
The White Fox Chronicles (2000)
The Time Hackers (2005)
The Legend of Bass Reeves: Being the True and Fictional Account of the Most Valiant Marshal in the West (2006)
Lawn Boy (2007)
Mudshark (2009)
Notes from the Dog (2009)
Woods Runner (2010)
Lawn Boy Returns (2010)
Masters of Disaster (2010)
Paintings from the Cave: Three Novellas
Man of the Iron Heads
Jo-Jo the Dog-Faced Girl
Erik's Rules
Road Trip (2013) (with Jim Paulsen)
Field Trip (2015) (with Jim Paulsen)
Six Kids and a Stuffed Cat (2016)
Fishbone's Song (2016)
How to Train Your Dad (2021)
Northwind (2022)

Nonfiction
The Grass-Eaters: Real Animals (1976)
The Small Ones (1976)
Hitting, Pitching, and Running (1976)
Martin Luther King: The Man Who Climbed the Mountain (1976)
Dribbling, Shooting, and Scoring (1976)
Careers in an Airport (1977)
Tackling, Running, and Kicking (1977)Riding, Roping, and Bulldogging (1977)Farm: A History And Celebration of the American Farmer (1977)Running, Jumping, and Throwing (1978)Successful Home Repair: When Not to Call the Contractor (1978)Forehanding and Backhanding (1978)Hiking and Backpacking (1978)Downhill, Hotdogging and Cross-Country (1979)Facing Off, Checking and Goaltending (1979)Launching, Floating High and Landing (1979)Pummeling, Falling and Getting Up-Sometimes (1979)Track, Enduro and Motocross (1979)Canoeing, Kayaking, and Rafting (1979)Going Very Fast in a Circle (1979)Athletics: Focus On Sport (1980)Ice Hockey: Focus On Sport (1980)Motor Cycling: Focus On Sport (1980)Motor Racing: Focus On Sport (1980)Skiing: Focus On Sport (1980)Tennis: Focus On Sport (1980)T.V. and Movie Animals (1980) (with Art Browne, Jr)Money Saving Home Repair Guide: Successful Home Improvement Series (1981)Sailing: From Jibs to Jibing (1981)Beat the System: A Survival Guide (1982)The Madonna Stories (1988)Woodsong (1990)Eastern Sun, Winter Moon (1993)Full of Hot Air: Launching, Floating High, And Landing (1993)A Guide for Using Hatchet in the Classroom (1994)Winterdance: The Fine Madness of Running the Iditarod (1994)Father Water, Mother Woods (1994)Puppies, Dogs, and Blue Northers (1996)My Life in Dog Years (1998)Pilgrimage on a Steel Ride: A Memoir of Men and Motorcycles (1997)All Aboard: Stories from Big Books (1998) Zero to Sixty: A Motorcycle Journey Through Midlife (1999) Guts: The True Stories Behind Hatchet and the Brian Books (2001)Caught by the Sea - My Life on Boats (2001)How Angel Peterson Got His Name (2003)This Side of Wild: Mutts, Mares, and Laughing Dinosaurs (2015)Gone to the Woods: Surviving a Lost Childhood: A True Story of Growing Up in the Wild'' (2021)

References

 
Bibliographies by writer
Bibliographies of American writers
Children's literature bibliographies